David with the Head of Goliath is a painting by Italian artist Massimo Stanzione, created c. 1642-1643. It is exhibited at the San Diego Museum of Art.

History
Caravaggio was an important influence in Stanzione’s artistic style and this painting illustrates a combination of styles from Caravaggio’s brutally realistic elements and dramatic lighting to classical 17th-century artistic trends including the lyrical style of Bologna artists. This painting shows David in an elegant posture, which softens the goriness, i.e. the dismembered head of Goliath. The theatrical lighting of this painting is a perfect demonstration of the chiaroscuro interpretation by Stanzione. Guido Reni and Caravaggio can be credited for Stanzione’s interpretation of chiaroscuro; they were supposedly his teachers. It was only after the painting was donated, that experts noticed under gallery lighting some aberrations in the canvas such as unevenness and crackle patterns. Those aberrations, along with the fact that young David appears to be gazing at something in the lower left corner led to suspicions that the canvas had been altered. By 1999, with the use of x-rays and careful removal of surface paint, the original paint of Goliath’s forehead was revealed. After intensive restoration, Goliath’s full face was uncovered and the painting restored to its original form. The full painting depicts Goliath’s dismembered head in the lower left corner, with David, knife in hand, gazing down to the lower left corner. It is believed that the head of Goliath was painted over in order to make the painting less gory and more appealing to potential buyers.

Provenance
In 1947, Mrs. Harry Turpin gifted a Stanzione original painting titled David With the Head of Goliath to the Fine Arts Gallery of San Diego (now the San Diego Museum of Art); the work was then attributed to Ribera, but was reattributed to Stanzione by Mario Modestini in 1951, an attribution confirmed by Schleier, Felton, Zeri, and Spinosa.

References

External links
 
 
 

1640s paintings
Paintings by Massimo Stanzione
Paintings depicting David
Paintings about death
Christian art about death
Paintings in the collection of the San Diego Museum of Art
Conservation and restoration of paintings